Purav Raja and Divij Sharan were the defending champions, but lost in the semifinals to Juan Sebastián Cabal and Treat Huey.

Cabal and Huey went on to win the title, defeating Sergio Galdós and Roberto Maytín in the final, 6–2, 6–3.

Seeds

Draw

References
 Main Draw

Los Cabos Open - Doubles
2017 D